Proverbs 25 is the 25th chapter of the Book of Proverbs in the Hebrew Bible or the Old Testament of the Christian Bible. The book is a compilation of several wisdom literature collections, with the heading in Proverbs 1:1 may be intended to regard Solomon as the traditional author of the whole book, but the dates of the individual collections are difficult to determine, and the book probably obtained its final shape in the post-exilic period. This chapter is the last part of the fifth collection of the book, so-called "the Second Solomonic Collection."

Text
The original text is written in Hebrew language. This chapter is divided into 28 verses.

Textual witnesses
Some early manuscripts containing the text of this chapter in Hebrew are of the Masoretic Text, which includes the Aleppo Codex (10th century), and Codex Leningradensis (1008).

There is also a translation into Koine Greek known as the Septuagint, made in the last few centuries BC; some extant ancient manuscripts of this version include Codex Vaticanus (B; B; 4th century), Codex Sinaiticus (S; BHK: S; 4th century), and Codex Alexandrinus (A; A; 5th century).

Analysis
This chapter belongs to a further collection of Solomonic proverbs, transmitted and
edited by royal scribes during the reign of Hezekiah, comprising Proverbs 25–29. This collection is introduced within the text as "[the] proverbs of Solomon which the men of Hezekiah king of Judah copied".

Based on differences in style and subject-matter there could be two originally separate collections: 
 Proverbs 25–27: characterized by many similes and the 'earthy' tone
 Proverbs 28–29: characterized by many antithetical sayings and the predominantly 'moral and religious' tone (cf. Proverbs 10–15)

Aberdeen theologian Kenneth Aitken argues that chapters 25-27 and 28-29 were originally separate collections, while Methodist minister Arno Gaebelein argues that chapters 27-29 as a unit constitute "instructions given to Solomon".

Verses 2 to 7 consist of a series of sayings regarding the king, followed by advice in verses 6 and 7 directed to royal officials.

Verse 1
These are also proverbs of Solomon,
which the men of Hezekiah king of Judah copied.
The proverbs in this collection differ from the earlier ones in that these are 'multiple line sayings using more similes'.

Verses 6–7
Do not exalt yourself in the presence of the king,
and do not stand in the place of great men;
for it is better that it be said to you, “Come up here,"
than that you should be put lower in the presence of the prince,
whom your eyes have seen.
David Brown notes that Jesus' parable in  includes "a reproduction" of verses 6 and 7.

See also

Related Bible parts: Proverbs 10, Proverbs 15, Proverbs 26, Luke 14

References

Sources

External links
 Jewish translations:
 Mishlei - Proverbs - Chapter 25 (Judaica Press) translation [with Rashi's commentary] at Chabad.org
 Christian translations:
 Online Bible at GospelHall.org (ESV, KJV, Darby, American Standard Version, Bible in Basic English)
 Book of Proverbs Chapter 25 King James Version
  Various versions

25